Virginia's fourth congressional district is a United States congressional district in the state of Virginia, taking in most of the area between Richmond and the North Carolina state line. It covers all or part of the counties of Brunswick, Charles City, Chesterfield, Dinwiddie, Greensville, Henrico, Prince George, Southampton, Surry, and Sussex, and all or part of the independent cities of Colonial Heights, Emporia, Hopewell, Petersburg, and Richmond. The district is currently represented by Democrat Jennifer McClellan, who was elected to the seat after she defeated Republican Leon Benjamin in the February 21, 2023 special election, caused by the death of incumbent Donald McEachin (D) on November 28, 2022.

2016 redistricting
In 2016, the adjacent 3rd district was found unconstitutional, leading court-ordered redistricting which transformed the 4th District from a Republican-leaning district to a safely Democratic seat for the 2016 elections.

Recent election results

2000s

2010s

2020s

Recent election results from statewide races

List of members representing the district

Historical district boundaries

See also

Virginia's congressional districts
List of United States congressional districts

References

 Congressional Biographical Directory of the United States 1774–present

04
Constituencies established in 1789
1789 establishments in Virginia
Constituencies disestablished in 1933
1933 disestablishments in Virginia
Constituencies established in 1935
1935 establishments in Virginia